The 5th Empire Awards ceremony, presented by the British film magazine Empire, honored the best films of 1999 and took place on 17 February 2000 at the Park Lane Hotel in London, England. During the ceremony, Empire presented Empire Awards in nine categories as well as five honorary awards. The honorary Contribution to Cinema award was introduced and presented for the only time this year. The honorary Movie Masterpiece Award was presented for the last time, having been presented for the first and only other time at the 4th Empire Awards in 1999. The awards were sponsored by Stella Artois for the third consecutive year.

Notting Hill won the most awards with three including Best British Film and Best British Director for Roger Michell. Other winners included The Matrix with two awards including Best Film and East Is East, Fight Club, Shakespeare in Love, The Sixth Sense and The World Is Not Enough with one. Kenneth Branagh received the Empire Inspiration Award, Michael Caine received the Lifetime Achievement Award, Industrial Light & Magic received the Contribution to Cinema award and Oliver Stone received the Movie Masterpiece Award for JFK.

Winners and nominees
Winners are listed first and highlighted in boldface.

Multiple awards
The following two films received multiple awards:

Multiple nominations
The following 12 films received multiple nominations:

Notes

References

External links
 
 

Empire Award ceremonies
1999 film awards
2000 in British cinema
2000 in London
February 2000 events in the United Kingdom